Hänssler-Verlag is a German music publishing house founded in 1919 as Musikverlag Hänssler by Friedrich Hänssler Senior (died 1972) to publish church music. The company is now based in Holzgerlingen. Since 1972 Hänssler Verlag has also published contemporary and jazz music. 

Hänssler Classic (now written hänssler CLASSIC in the company's own materials), was founded 1975 by Friedrich Hänssler Jr., as the company's in-house classical record label. The record label is one of the publishers of the classical radio station Südwestrundfunk (SWR) which has three orchestras, a choir and a big band. The label is also a partner with the Internationale Bachakademie Stuttgart, founded 1981 by Helmuth Rilling.

In 2002 Hänssler became part of SCM (:de:Stiftung Christliche Medien), an Evangelical Christian media foundation.

References

Classical music record labels
Music publishing companies of Germany